They Live is a soundtrack by John Carpenter & Alan Howarth for the film of the same name. It was released in 1988 through Enigma Records. An expanded 20th Anniversary Edition was released in 2008 through Alan Howarth Incorporated.

Track listing

Personnel
 John Carpenter – composition, performance, production
 Alan Howarth - composition, performance, synthesizer programming, sequencing, editing, recording, production

References

John Carpenter soundtracks
1988 soundtrack albums
Film scores
Enigma Records albums
Science fiction film soundtracks
Action film soundtracks
Horror film soundtracks